CBM-CFS3 (Carbon Budget Model of the Canadian Forest Sector) is a Windows-based software modelling framework for stand- and landscape-level forest ecosystem carbon accounting. It is used to calculate forest carbon stocks and stock changes for the past (monitoring) or into the future (projection). It can be used to create, simulate and compare various forest management scenarios in order to assess impacts on carbon. It is compliant with requirements under the Kyoto Protocol and with the Good Practice Guidance for Land Use, Land-Use Change and Forestry (2003) report published by the Intergovernmental Panel on Climate Change (IPCC).   

It is the central model of the Government of Canada's National Forest Carbon Monitoring, Accounting and Reporting System (NFCMARS). The CBM-CFS3 was developed through a collaboration between Natural Resources Canada's Canadian Forest Service (CFS) and the Canadian Model Forest Network, and is currently supported by the CFS. The CBM-CFS3 is distributed at no charge by the Canadian Forest Service through Canada's National Forest Information System web site. Technical support is available by contacting Stephen Kull, Carbon Model Extension Forester, at the CFS.

See also
Carbon accounting

External links
Canadian Forest Service, Forest Carbon Accounting Web Site
Canadian Forest Service CBM-CFS3 Web Site
Natural Resources Canada Web Site
Canadian Forest Service Web Site
The Canadian Model Forest Network
Good Practice Guidance for Land Use, Land-Use Change and Forestry

Forest models
Climate change in Canada